After Hours is a 1996 studio album for Novus Records by jazz guitarist John Pizzarelli and his trio. Most of the album consists of old standards, and features guests like Randy Sandke and Harry Allen.

Track listing 
"Coquette"
"Guess I'll Hang My Tears Out to Dry"
"I'll Never Be The Same"
"They Can't Take That Away from Me"
"You're Lookin' at Me"
"Mam'selle"
"But Not for Me"
"Lullaby"
"In the Wee Small Hours of the Morning"
"Sometimes I'm Happy"
"It Might as Well Be Spring"
"Be My Baby Tonight"
"Stringbean"

Personnel
John Pizzarelli
Martin Pizzarelli double-bass
Ray Kennedy piano
Randy Sandke guest
Harry Allen guest, saxophone

References

1996 albums
John Pizzarelli albums
Novus Records albums